Thunder and Lightnings is a realistic children's novel by Jan Mark, published in 1976 by Kestrel Books of Harmondsworth in London, with illustrations by Jim Russell. Set in Norfolk, it features a developing friendship between two boys who share an interest in aeroplanes, living near RAF Coltishall during the months in 1974 when the Royal Air Force is phasing out its English Electric Lightning fighters and introducing the SEPECAT Jaguar.

Mark won the annual Carnegie Medal from the Library Association, recognising the year's best children's book by a British subject. She also won a prize for children's novels by new writers, sponsored by The Guardian newspaper.

Atheneum Books published the first U.S. edition in 1979, retaining the Russell illustrations.

Origins

Jan and Neil Mark and their daughter Isobel moved to Norfolk in 1973 and lived "directly under a flight-path, with Lightning fighters from RAF Coltishall taking off 200 feet above the roof". According to her obituary in The Guardian, she wrote her debut novel Thunder and Lightnings for "the Kestrel/Guardian prize for a children's novel by a previously unpublished writer", and won it.

Plot summary

Andrew Mitchell moves to Tiler's Cottage in East Anglia. He goes to his new school and meets Victor Skelton in General Studies class. The two slowly become friends and do things together, including going to RAF Coltishall to see the aeroplanes, which are English Electric Lightnings. Victor is devastated when he discovers that his beloved Lightnings are to be replaced with Jaguars.

See also

Notes

References

External links
 —immediately, first US edition 

1976 British novels
Aviation novels
British children's novels
Carnegie Medal in Literature winning works
Novels set in Norfolk
1976 children's books
1976 debut novels